Bertha Benz (3 May 1849 – 5 May 1944) was a German automotive pioneer and inventor. She was the business partner and wife of automobile inventor Carl Benz. On 5 August 1888, she was the first person to drive an internal-combustion-engined automobile over a long distance, field testing the Benz Patent-Motorwagen, inventing brake lining and solving several practical issues during the journey of 105 km (65 miles). In doing so, she brought the Patent-Motorwagen worldwide attention and got the company its first sales.

Early life and marriage

Cäcilie Bertha Ringer was born on 3 May 1849 to a wealthy family in Pforzheim in the Grand Duchy of Baden.

Two years before her marriage to Carl Benz, she used part of her dowry to invest in his failing iron construction company. As an unmarried woman, she was able to do so; after she married Benz, according to German law, Bertha lost her legal power to act as an investor. On 20 July 1872, Bertha Ringer married Carl Benz. As he moved on to a new manufacturing venture, Benz & Cie, he continued to use her dowry as financial support.

Carl finished work on his first horseless carriage in December 1885. Bertha served as a field tester, contributing to the design of the Motorwagen by adding wire insulation and inventing leather brake pads to supplement the wooden brakes when they failed. Moreover, she identified several key areas of opportunities – such as the fuel line design – that Carl later improved. In addition to her contributions to the machine’s design, Bertha helped finance the development of the Motorwagen. She would hold patent rights under modern law, but as a married woman, she was not allowed to be named as an inventor on the patent at that time.

Together they had five children: Eugen (1873–1958), Richard (1874–1955), Clara (1876–1968), Thilde (1882–1974), and Ellen (1890–1973).

The Patent Motor Car

On July 3, 1886, Benz presented the Patent-Motorwagen automobile to the public in Mannheim. Within the decade, 25 vehicles had been built. With cutting-edge bicycle constructions, the Model I was the original Patent Motor Car and the world's first automobile.

The Model II was converted to a four-wheeler for test purposes, making it the only one of this model.

The first Patent Motor Car sold in small production runs was the Model III. It had powered rear wheels with a ringed steel and solid rubber, steerable front wheel. Various options from which to choose were provided for customers, such as seat arrangements and a folding top.

First cross-country automobile journey

On 5 August 1888, 39-year-old Bertha Benz drove from Mannheim to Pforzheim with her sons Richard and Eugen, thirteen and fifteen years old respectively, in a Model III, without telling her husband and without permission of the authorities, thus becoming the first person to drive an automobile a significant distance. Before this historic trip, motorized drives were merely very short trials, returning to the point of origin, made with assistance of mechanics.
 
Although the ostensible purpose of the trip was to visit her mother, Bertha Benz had other motives — to prove to her husband, who had failed to adequately consider marketing his invention, that the automobile in which they both had heavily invested would become a financial success once it was shown to be useful to the general public; and to give her husband the confidence that his constructions had a future.

She left Mannheim around dawn, solving numerous problems along the way. Bertha demonstrated her significant technical capabilities on this journey. With no fuel tank and only a 4.5-litre supply of petrol in the carburetor, she had to find ligroin, the petroleum solvent needed for the car to run. The solvent was only available at apothecary shops, so she stopped in Wiesloch at the city pharmacy to purchase the fuel. At the time, petrol and other fuels could only be bought from chemists [pharmacists in US English], and so this is how the chemist in Wiesloch became the first fuel station in the world.

She cleaned a blocked fuel line with her hat pin and used her garter as insulation material. A blacksmith had to help mend a chain at one point. When the wooden brakes began to fail, Benz visited a cobbler to install leather, making the world's first pair of brake linings. An evaporative cooling system was employed to cool the engine, making water supply a big worry along the trip. The trio added water to their supply every time they stopped. The car's two gears were not enough to surmount uphill inclines and Eugen and Richard often had to push the vehicle up steep roads. Benz reached Pforzheim somewhat after dusk, notifying her husband of her successful journey by telegram. She drove back to Mannheim several days later.

The novel trip received a great deal of publicity, as she had sought. The drive was a key event in the technical development of the automobile. The pioneering couple introduced several improvements after Bertha's experiences. She reported everything that had happened along the way and made important suggestions, such as the introduction of an additional gear for climbing hills and brake linings to improve brake-power. Her trip demonstrated to the burgeoning automotive industry that test drives were essential to their business.

Later life

Benz died in her villa in Ladenburg in 1944, where the workshop of Carl Benz had been built after they had moved there in 1906 and he established a solely family-held business, Benz and Sons. Carl Benz had died in 1929, after the success of Daimler-Benz was assured. Members of the family resided in the home for 25 more years. The Benz home now has been designated as historic and is used as a scientific meeting facility for a nonprofit foundation, the Daimler and Benz Foundation, which aims to promote science and research in order to gain a better understanding of the correlation between man, the environment and technology.

In 1925 Carl Benz wrote the following in his memoirs: "Only one person remained with me in the small ship of life when it seemed destined to sink. That was my wife. Bravely and resolutely she set the new sails of hope."

Honours

In 2008, the Bertha Benz Memorial Route was officially approved as a route of the industrial heritage of humankind, because it follows Bertha Benz's path during the world's first long-distance journey by automobile in 1888. Now it is possible to follow the 194 km of signs indicating her route from Mannheim via Heidelberg to Pforzheim (Black Forest) and back.

It was a globally visible signal for new automobile breakthroughs, and was only open for sustainable mobility — future-oriented vehicles with alternative drive systems, i.e., hybrid and electric, hydrogen and fuel cell vehicles, and other extremely economical vehicles. The motto is Bertha Benz Challenge – Sustainable Mobility on the World's Oldest Automobile Road!

On 25 January 2011 Deutsche Welle (DW-TV) broadcast worldwide in its series, Made in Germany, a TV documentary on the invention of the automobile by Carl Benz, highlighting the very important role of his wife, Bertha Benz.  The report is not only on the history of the automobile, but takes a look at its future as well, shown by the Bertha Benz Challenge on 10 and 11 September 2011.

The documentary The Car is Born, produced by Ulli Kampelmann, centered on the first road trip by Bertha Benz.

In 2011, a television movie about the life of Carl and Bertha Benz was made, titled , which premiered on 11 May and was aired by Das Erste on 23 May. A trailer of the movie and a "making of" special were released on YouTube.

In honor of International Women’s Day in 2019, the modern Daimler company commissioned a four-minute advertisement dramatizing portions of Bertha Benz’ 1888 journey. The ad was created by Berlin-based ad agency Antoni (the lead European agency for Mercedes-Benz), and directed by Sebastian Strasser via his production company, Anorak Film.

In popular culture
In 2011, a dramatized television movie about the life of Carl and Bertha Benz was made named  which premiered on 11 May and was aired by Das Erste on 23 May. A trailer of the movie and a "making of" special were released on YouTube.

See also
 Louise Sarazin – French businesswoman who played a significant role in early automotive history.

References

Notes

Bibliography

External links

Bertha Benz Memorial Route
Automuseum Dr. Carl Benz, 2018.
The Car is Born – A documentary of Bertha Benz's historic drive by Ulli Kampelmann. 
The First Road Trip – Teaching overview and question set.

1849 births
1944 deaths
Benz vehicles
German automotive pioneers
19th-century German inventors
Karl Benz
People associated with the internal combustion engine
People from the Grand Duchy of Baden
People from Pforzheim
Women inventors
19th-century German businesspeople
20th-century German businesspeople